Anolis calimae, Ayala's anole, is a species of lizard in the family Dactyloidae. The species is found in Colombia.

References

Anoles
Endemic fauna of Colombia
Reptiles of Colombia
Reptiles described in 1983
Taxa named by Stephen Charles Ayala
Taxa named by Dennis M. Harris
Taxa named by Ernest Edward Williams